is a former Japanese football player. He played for Japan national team. He also managed Japan women's national team.

Club career
Ikeda was born in Shizuoka Prefecture on January 5, 1962. After graduating from Shizuoka Gakuen High School, he joined Nissan Motors in 1980. The club won the 1983 and 1985 Emperor's Cup. From 1988 to 1990, the club won all three major titles in Japan: the Japan Soccer League, the JSL Cup, and the Emperor's Cup, for two years in a row. The club also won the 1989 Emperor's Cup. He moved to Matsushita Electric in 1990. The club won the 1990 Emperor's Cup. He retired in 1992.

National team career
On June 4, 1985, Ikeda debuted for Japan national team against Malaysia.

Coaching career
After retirement, Ikeda started coaching career at Gamba Osaka (former Matsushita Electric) in 1992. In 1998, he became a manager for L.League club Matsushita Electric Panasonic Bambina and managed until 1999. In 2000, he became a manager for Japan women's national team. He managed at 2001 AFC Women's Championship and Japan won the 2nd place. He managed until April 2002. He also managed Japan U-20 women's national team for 2002 U-19 Women's World Championship. After that, he managed Gunma Horikoshi (2003-2004) and Zweigen Kanazawa (2007-2008).

Club statistics

National team statistics

References

External links

Japan National Football Team Database

1962 births
Living people
Association football people from Shizuoka Prefecture
Japanese footballers
Japan international footballers
Japan Soccer League players
Yokohama F. Marinos players
Gamba Osaka players
Japanese football managers
Japan women's national football team managers
Zweigen Kanazawa managers
Association football defenders